Elias de Oliveira Rosa (born 8 February 1983), known as Kanú, is a Brazilian professional footballer who plays as a right winger.

Football career
Born in Boa Esperança, Minas Gerais, Kanú started playing professionally with Cruzeiro Esporte Clube, but only appeared in seven Série A games over the course of three seasons. In 2005, he was loaned to Série C club Ipatinga Esporte Clube.

Kanú moved to Portugal for 2005–06, joining C.S. Marítimo in the Primeira Liga. He made his debut in the competition on 18 September 2005, starting and playing 64 minutes in a 2–2 home draw against F.C. Penafiel. Precisely during that campaign, he scored a career-best eight goals (from 25 games) to help his team finish in tenth position.

On 22 July 2010, Kanú contributed with one goal to a 3–2 away win over Sporting Fingal F.C. for the third qualifying round of the UEFA Europa League (6–4 on aggregate). He left the island of Madeira in late January of the following year, taking his game to the United Arab Emirates and Kuwait, this being interspersed with a brief spell back in his country with amateurs Nacional Esporte Clube (MG).

References

External links

1983 births
Living people
Sportspeople from Minas Gerais
Brazilian footballers
Association football wingers
Campeonato Brasileiro Série A players
Cruzeiro Esporte Clube players
Ipatinga Futebol Clube players
Primeira Liga players
Segunda Divisão players
C.S. Marítimo players
UAE First Division League players
UAE Pro League players
Al-Ittihad Kalba SC players
Khor Fakkan Sports Club players
Al Tadhamon SC players
Al Jahra SC players
Al-Arabi SC (Kuwait) players
Brazilian expatriate footballers
Expatriate footballers in Portugal
Expatriate footballers in the United Arab Emirates
Expatriate footballers in Kuwait
Expatriate footballers in Bahrain
Brazilian expatriate sportspeople in Portugal
Brazilian expatriate sportspeople in the United Arab Emirates
Brazilian expatriate sportspeople in Kuwait
Kuwait Premier League players